Marek Wietecki (born 2 June 1983) is a Polish Paralympic athlete who competes at international elite competitions. He is a World bronze medalist and a European champion in discus throw, he has also won two medals in javelin throw. He competed at the 2020 Summer Paralympics in the javelin throw and shot put where he finished in sixth place in both events on his debut appearance at the Games.

References

1983 births
Living people
Sportspeople from Gorzów Wielkopolski
Paralympic athletes of Poland
Polish male discus throwers
Polish male javelin throwers
Polish male shot putters
Medalists at the World Para Athletics Championships
Medalists at the World Para Athletics European Championships
Athletes (track and field) at the 2020 Summer Paralympics